The Gorby Opera Theater on Idaho Street in Glenns Ferry, Idaho was built in 1914.  It was listed on the National Register of Historic Places in 1982.

It is a  brick building with concrete trim.  It has a parapeted front facade with a round-arched entryway.  It was designed by architects Tourtellotte & Hummel.

The building was funded by R. D. Gorby.

References

Theatres on the National Register of Historic Places in Idaho
Theatres completed in 1914
National Register of Historic Places in Elmore County, Idaho